Statistics of Swedish football Division 3 for the 2003 season.

League standings

Norra Norrland 2003

Mellersta Norrland 2003

Södra Norrland 2003

Norra Svealand 2003

Östra Svealand 2003

Västra Svealand 2003

Nordöstra Götaland 2003

Nordvästra Götaland 2003

Mellersta Götaland 2003

Sydöstra Götaland 2003

Sydvästra Götaland 2003

Södra Götaland 2003

Footnotes

References 

Swedish Football Division 3 seasons
4
Sweden
Sweden